Karantina is a light rail station on the Konak Tram line in İzmir, Turkey. It is located within the 15 Temmuz Demkorasi Şehitleri Square in east Konak, above the Mustafa Kemal Coastal Boulevard as the throughway passes underneath the square. The station was originally named Mithatpaşa Lisesi from the historic Mithatpaşa high-school, located one block south of the station.

Connections
ESHOT operates city bus service on Mithatpaşa Street.

Nearby Places of Interest
Mithatpaşa high-school - A historic high-school built in the late 19th century.
15 July Democracy Martyrs Square - The square around the station.

References

Railway stations opened in 2018
2018 establishments in Turkey
Konak District
Tram transport in İzmir